Roza is an urban locality (a work settlement) in Korkinsky District of Chelyabinsk Oblast, Russia. Population:

History
It was founded on October 1, 1981. The official holiday of Roza is observed on the last Sunday of August.

References

Urban-type settlements in Chelyabinsk Oblast